Northland Christian School is a private, Christian, PK-12 school located in Northwest Houston.

History

Northland Christian School (NCS) was established in the spring of 1974. Seeking to create a school in their community that combined excellence in education with a commitment to teaching Biblical principles, a group of dedicated families from Bammel Church of Christ gathered $1,000 of seed money, sought teachers who shared their vision, and found a physical location for the school.

Instrumental in the founding of NCS were DeAnna and Jim Graves, in whose honor their elementary school building is named. DeAnna was Northland Christian's first Head of School, as well as one of its first dedicated teachers, among countless other roles. Jim Graves served as a board member for 20 years and supported Northland Christian in those crucial early years.

NCS officially opened in the fall of 1974 with a combined enrollment of 43 students. Now, they have around 520 students annually. With a strong international program of around 40 students each year, and domestic students from more than 60 Houston area zip codes, NCS is small but diverse.

Campuses
As of Fall 2019, the elementary and secondary schools are located on the same campus. Contact Information." Northland Christian School. Retrieved on November 26, 2008.</ref><ref>

Main Campus
The NCS campus has several buildings where classes are held which are referred to as Buildings 1-5. Building 6 is where the school cafeteria, gym, and the orchestra room is located. Building 7 is the elementary building, and Building 8 houses the administrative offices.

The Northland Christian School Campus is located on Sylvanfield Avenue in close proximity to a major intersection of FM 1960 and Stuebner-Airline Road, and Bammel North Houston and Veterans Memorial (Continued from Stuebner Airline).

Building 1

Secondary Student Services

Secondary Principal's Office

The NAC

MS & HS classrooms

Building 3

Counselors' Office

MS & HS Classrooms

Building 6

PK/ES Office

ES Library

PK/ES Classrooms

Building 7

Cafeteria/ Gymnasium

Orchestra Classroom

Music Classroom

Building 8

Admissions

Administration Offices

International Dorm

MS & HS classrooms

Standardized Tests

Northland is exempt from TAKS (Texas Assessment of Knowledge and Skills) since it is a private school. Students in grades Kindergarten to 9th grade take the Stanford Achievement Test. Students in grades 3,5, and 7 take the OLSAT Achievement Test. In 7th grade, students identified as "gifted and talented" take the SAT Test for admission into Duke's TIP Program. In 10 or 11th grade, students take the PSAT/NMSQT test. In 11th and/or 12th grade, students take the SAT and/or the ACT tests.

Athletics
Northland Christian School offers athletics for both middle and high school students. All students are also required to participate in Physical Education or Athletics. There is an option for students participating in Olympic-level sports such as gymnastics, cheerleading, tumbling, soccer, taekwondo, karate, baseball, football, swimming, etc. outside of school as Off-campus PE to take study hall if they document at least 15 hours per week.

Northland Christian School provides the following sports: Baseball, Basketball, Cheerleading, Cross Country, Football, Golf, Soccer, Softball, Swimming, Tennis, Track, Volleyball.

Sixth grade students are allowed to try out for Seventh grade teams. Eighth grade students are allowed to try out for high school sports if needed by the school to fill in the vacant spots such as the Junior Varsity Baseball Team.

Fine arts
Northland Christian School provides a variety of fine arts courses of performing and visual arts. Courses such as art, drama, photography, orchestra, choir, and jazz ensemble are available.

References

External links
 Northland Christian School

Christian schools in Texas
Private K-12 schools in Harris County, Texas